The Bishop of Coventry was a suffragan bishop of the Church of England Diocese of Worcester in the Province of Canterbury.

In the late nineteenth century there were two suffragan bishops of Coventry appointed to assist John Perowne, Bishop of Worcester, in overseeing the Diocese of Worcester.

References

 
Coventry suffragan
Bishops suffragan of Coventry
Anglican Diocese of Worcester